Bhupendra Nath Mishra was an Indian politician, pleader and landlord. He was elected to the Lok Sabha, the lower house of the Parliament of India from Raipur,  Madhya Pradesh as a member of the Indian National Congress.

References

External links
  Official biographical sketch on the Parliament of India website

1918 births
Indian National Congress politicians
Lok Sabha members from Madhya Pradesh
India MPs 1952–1957